Blackacre State Nature Preserve is a  nature preserve and historic homestead in Louisville, Kentucky. The preserve features rolling fields, streams, forests, and a homestead dating back to the 18th century. For visitors, the preserve features several farm animals including horses, goats, and cows, hiking trails, and a visitor's center in the 1844-built Presley Tyler home. Since 1981, it has been used by the Jefferson County Public Schools as the site of a continuing environmental education program.  About 10,000 students visit the outdoor classroom each year.

The preserve was created in 1979 when the land was given to the Office of Kentucky Nature Preserves by Judge Macauley and Mrs. Emilie Smith creating the first nature preserve in the Commonwealth's system.  The Blackacre Conservancy, founded in 1983, operates the historic homestead and conducts cultural and historical programs while the Office retains ownership of the preserve and manages its natural resources.

Blackacre is part of the old Moses Tyler farm, several original farm buildings remain, including the 1844 Presley Tyler home, an Appalachian-style barn and a reconstructed stone spring house.  The entire  settlement has been named a national historic rural settlement.  It was listed on the National Register of Historic Places as Tyler Settlement Rural Historic District in 1986.

The name Blackacre is used as a generic name in legal contexts, particularly in law school and on bar exams, to refer to a parcel of land. The Smith family gave the land the name Blackacre; previously it was known as Land O'Skye.

History
Blackacre was first settled by the Tyler Family, who arrived in Louisville in 1780. Edward Tyler II purchased a Treasury Warrant allowing him to lay claim to a  parcel of land. Moses Tyler was transferred, a portion of that, the  that now compromise the majority of Blackacre. Later the land was given to Moses's son, Presley. Moses Tyler had already built a barn, a stone cottage and springhouse, but Presley decided to add an impressive two-story farmhouse. In 1884 Presley sold the property to the Kroeger family, who were stewards of the property until 1902. After a series of other owners, the property was bought by the Smith family in 1950. In 1979 Emilie and Macauley Smith, seeing the immense beauty and value of the land, donated it to the Commonwealth of Kentucky, allowing Blackacre to become the first State Nature Preserve of Kentucky.

Buildings
The barn is one of the three original Blackacre buildings. Built in 1790, the double-crib Appalachian barn was made out of large poplar boards harvested from the Blackacre property. Today the barn displays the pre-industrial farm tools that would have been used at Blackacre.

The stone cottage is the second original 1790 building. 

The springhouse is the last of the original buildings. Springhouses acted as a refrigeration unit. Perishable food that could not be salted or smoked would be stored. A second floor of the spring was built to allow residents to cool off on hot days. The spring that lies next to the springhouse is man-made.

The farmhouse was built in 1844. Architecturally, it displays the influence of Greek-revival design. The farmhouse now holds the Blackacre's Visitors' Center.

Gallery

See also
 List of attractions and events in the Louisville metropolitan area
 National Register of Historic Places listings in Jefferson County, Kentucky

References

External links
Blackacre Conservancy
Office of Kentucky Nature Preserves

Greek Revival houses in Kentucky
Infrastructure completed in 1790
Houses completed in 1844
Houses in Louisville, Kentucky
History of Louisville, Kentucky
Nature reserves in Kentucky
National Register of Historic Places in Louisville, Kentucky
Tourist attractions in Louisville, Kentucky
Protected areas established in 1979
Protected areas of Jefferson County, Kentucky
Nature centers in Kentucky
1790 establishments in Virginia
Historic districts on the National Register of Historic Places in Kentucky
Environmental education in the United States
Jefferson County Public Schools (Kentucky)
1844 establishments in Kentucky
1979 establishments in Kentucky
Springs of Kentucky
Spring houses